The Daytime Emmy Award for Outstanding Talk Show  is an award presented annually by the National Academy of Television Arts and Sciences (NATAS) to honor daytime talk shows. It was first awarded at the 1st Daytime Emmy Awards ceremony held in 1974. From the 35th Daytime Emmy Awards in 2008 to the 49th Daytime Emmy Awards in 2022, the award was divided into two specific categories: Outstanding Talk Show—Informative, honoring talk shows that were more informative in nature, and Outstanding Talk Show—Entertainment, honoring those that were more entertainment in nature. In 2023, the NATAS will merge the two specific categories back into one.

In the lists below, the winner of the award for each year is shown first, followed by the other nominees.

1970s
 1974: The Merv Griffin Show
 1975: Dinah!
 1976: Dinah!
 1977: The Merv Griffin Show
 1978:  Donahue
 1979: Donahue

1980s
 1980: Donahue
 1981: Donahue 1982: The Richard Simmons Show 1983: This Old House 1984: Woman to Woman 1985: Donahue 1986: Donahue 
 1987: The Oprah Winfrey Show 1988: The Oprah Winfrey Show 1989: The Oprah Winfrey Show1990s
 1990: Sally Jessy Raphael 1991: The Oprah Winfrey Show 1992: The Oprah Winfrey Show 1993: Good Morning America 1994: The Oprah Winfrey Show 1995: The Oprah Winfrey Show 1996: The Oprah Winfrey Show 1997: The Oprah Winfrey Show 1998: The Rosie O'Donnell Show 1999: The Rosie O'Donnell Show2000s
 2000: The Rosie O'Donnell Show 2001: The Rosie O'Donnell Show 2002: The Rosie O'Donnell Show 2003: The View and The Wayne Brady Show 2004: The Ellen DeGeneres Show 2005: The Ellen DeGeneres Show 2006: The Ellen DeGeneres Show 2007: The Ellen DeGeneres Show''

References

 "The Emmy Awards." The 2003 People Almanac. New York: Cader Books, 2002.
 http://www.emmyonline.org/daytime/

Daytime Emmy Awards